Daniele Bracciali and Potito Starace were the defending champions, but lost in the final to Frederico Gil and Carlos Berlocq by 6–3, 7–6(7–5).

Seeds

Main draw

Draw

Note: Rubén Ramírez Hidalgo / Jiří Vaněk and Paul Capdeville / Diego Junqueira, which were supposed to play with Daniele Bracciali / Potito Starace in the semifinals, chose to not compete. Italian pair received "bye" into the final.

References
Main Draw

Sporting Challenger - Doubles
Sporting Challenger